Annette Evans (born 28 May 1944) is a Scottish former international lawn bowler.

Bowls career
Evans won the Women's Scottish National Bowls Championships title in 1987 and subsequently won the singles at the British Isles Bowls Championships in 1988. Her biggest accomplishment was winning gold in the fours during the 1985 World Outdoor Bowls Championship with Sarah Gourlay, Elizabeth Christie and Frances Whyte .

Evans retired in 1990 from international competition.

References

Scottish female bowls players
Living people
1944 births
Bowls World Champions